Anja Kruse (born 5 August 1956) is a German film and television actress. She played the title role in the 1984 historical series  Beautiful Wilhelmine.

Selected filmography

Film
 The White Rose (1982)
 Die Einsteiger (1985)
 Schloß Königswald (1988)
 Jump! (2007)
 Vivaldi, the Red Priest (2009)
 The Gardener of God (2013)

Television
 Beautiful Wilhelmine (1984)
 The Black Forest Clinic (1986–1987)
Le Retour d'Arsène Lupin (1989)
 By Way of the Stars (1992)
 Glückliche Reise (1992–1993)
 The Alaska Kid (1993)
 Die ProSieben Märchenstunde (2006)

References

Bibliography
 Klossner, Michael. The Europe of 1500–1815 on Film and Television: A Worldwide Filmography of Over 2550 Works, 1895 Through 2000. McFarland & Company, 2002.

External links

1956 births
Living people
German film actresses
German television actresses
People from Essen